"Chasing After You" is a song recorded by American country music singer-songwriters Ryan Hurd and Maren Morris. It was released on February 12, 2021 as the lead single from Hurd's debut album Pelago. The song was written by Brinley Addington and Jerry Flowers and produced by Teddy Reimer and Aaron Eshuis.

Background
Hurd said in a statement: "This is the first time we've gotten to do an actual duet together. It feels like the timing is really perfect and it's a full circle moment to get to make music together in this way."

Content
"Chasing After You" is the couple's first duet, with the lyrics telling a love story between Hurd and Morris.

Charts

Weekly charts

Year-end charts

Certifications

References

2021 singles
2021 songs
Ryan Hurd songs
Maren Morris songs
Songs written by Jerry Flowers
RCA Records Nashville singles
Male–female vocal duets